Preta is a cattle breed from Portugal.

Description
Colour - uniformly black
Muzzle - pigmented
Profile - upright
Horns - high curved

Characteristics

Extension

The breed region is circumscribed almost exclusively to the Southern Portugal in the Upper Alentejo Region.

External links
http://autoctones.ruralbit.com/?rac=33&esp=1

Cattle breeds
Cattle breeds originating in Portugal